Christoffer Henri Mafoumbi (born 3 March 1994) is a professional footballer who plays as a goalkeeper for Differdange in the BGL League. Born in France, Mafoumbi represents the Congo national football team.

Club career

Born in Roubaix, Mafoumbi joined Lille OSC's youth setup in 2005, aged 11. In 2010, he moved to RC Lens, being later assigned to the reserves in Championnat de France amateur the following year.

Mafoumbi made his senior debut on 26 May 2012, starting in a goalless home draw against AC Amiens. On 12 April 2013, he appeared with the main squad in a goalless away draw against SM Caen for the Ligue 2 championship, but remained as an unused substitute.

On 23 July 2014, Mafoumbi joined US Le Pontet, also in CFA.

On 25 November 2015, Mafoumbi signed a contract with Bulgarian side Vereya.

On 20 July 2017, Mafoumbi signed a two-year contract with English League One side Blackpool.

He joined League Two club Morecambe on loan for the second half of the 2019–20 season on 15 January 2020.

Mafoumbi was released by Blackpool in June 2020.

After spending some time in Malta with Mosta, Mafoumbi joined Luxembourg-based side Differdange for the 2022-23 season. In October 2022, he pledged himself on a part-time basis for the newly-formed English Lower League side AFC Crewe.

International career
Mafoumbi made his international debut for Congo on 12 October 2012, playing the entire second half in a 0–3 friendly loss against Egypt. On 8 January 2015, he was included in Claude Le Roy's 23-man squad for the 2015 Africa Cup of Nations. Mafoumbi made his debut in the competition on 17 January, starting in a 1–1 draw against Equatorial Guinea.

Mafoumbi started the first two games of Congo's appearance at the 2021 Africa Cup of Nations qualifiers.

Career statistics

Club

References

External links
 Lens official profile 
 
 
 

1994 births
Living people
Sportspeople from Roubaix
Republic of the Congo footballers
Republic of the Congo international footballers
French footballers
French sportspeople of Republic of the Congo descent
Association football goalkeepers
US Pontet Grand Avignon 84 players
FC Vereya players
Blackpool F.C. players
Morecambe F.C. players
2015 Africa Cup of Nations players
French expatriate footballers
Republic of the Congo expatriate footballers
Expatriate footballers in Bulgaria
Expatriate footballers in England
French expatriate sportspeople in Bulgaria
French expatriate sportspeople in England
Republic of the Congo expatriate sportspeople in Bulgaria
Republic of the Congo expatriate sportspeople in England
Black French sportspeople
Footballers from Hauts-de-France